Littrell is a surname. Notable people with the surname include:

Brian Littrell (born 1975), American singer-songwriter, member of the Backstreet Boys
Gary L. Littrell (born 1944), retired United States Army Command Sergeant Major who received the Medal of Honor
Jack Littrell (1929–2009), Major League Baseball shortstop in the 1950s
Littrell (full name: Lindsay Littrell) (born 1980), singer/songwriter, scholar and educator

See also
Littorella
Luttrell (disambiguation)
Luttrellia